Troy Hashimoto is an American politician who is currently the Hawaii state representative in Hawaii's 8th district. He won the seat after longtime incumbent Democrat Joseph Souki resigned after allegations of sexual assault by several women. He previously was executive assistant to Maui County Council Chair Mike White.

References

Living people
Democratic Party members of the Hawaii House of Representatives
21st-century American politicians
University of Denver alumni
Hawaii politicians of Japanese descent
Year of birth missing (living people)